Romke Harke de Jong (born 5 April 1984) is a Dutch entrepreneur and politician of the social liberal party Democrats 66 (D66). He took over and expanded his father's ice cream catering company and served on the municipal council of Opsterland in Friesland between 2010 and 2018. De Jong became a member of the States of Friesland the following year, and he was elected to the House of Representatives in the 2021 general election.

Early life and non-political career 
De Jong was born in 1984 in the Friesland city of Heerenveen and grew up in the nearby town of Gorredijk. His father was the owner of a restaurant and a Gorredijk ice cream catering company, founded by Romke's grandfather in 1947, called De Jong's IJs. His father also served as an Opsterland municipal councilor and alderman for D66 in the 1990s. De Jong started working for De Jong's IJs in his teenage years, and he studied commercial economics at the Hanze University of Applied Sciences in Groningen.

In 2006, while studying, he became co-owner of De Jong's IJs. De Jong and his father expanded their company by constructing a larger factory and by starting a franchise chain of ice cream and chocolate shops under the name Lilly's. Several locations were opened in 2009, most of them located in the northern provinces of the Netherlands. A Lilly's store on the Caribbean island Bonaire was opened in early 2011. The number of locations kept increasing to over ten until a spike was reached. Lilly's had six stores left in 2016, while the production capacity of De Jong's IJs was being raised. De Jong also invested to make his factory carbon neutral. His father temporarily took over as CEO when he became an MP in 2021.

Politics

Local and provincial 
De Jong was a member of Young Democrats, Democrats 66's independent youth wing, after a short period at the Labour Party. He ran for Opsterland municipal councilor in the 2006 municipal elections as the third candidate of the new local party Opsterlanders, which had come into existence due to a merger of Opsterland Anders and the local chapters of D66 and GroenLinks. De Jong did not become a council member, as Opsterlanders won one seat.

D66 left the partnership Opsterlanders in the run-up to the 2010 municipal election in Opsterland. De Jong was D66's lead candidate and was elected to the municipal council. He was re-elected in 2014 as D66's lead candidate, and he was again the only member of his party in the municipal council. D66 became part of the governing coalition in Opsterland but left after the party had lost faith in an alderman in March 2016. De Jong gave up his seat in the municipal council in December 2017 to focus on his business.

He re-entered politics in the 2019 provincial election in Friesland, when he was elected to the Provincial Council of Friesland as D66's lead candidate. De Jong campaigned on constructing the Lelylijn, a proposed railway between Lelystad and Groningen. In the States Provincial, he introduced a bill to reduce regulations on wind turbine construction by local communities, but it did not receive a majority.

House of Representatives 
In the 2021 general election, De Jong was D66's 24th candidate. During the campaign, he said that he wanted the Netherlands to become a frontrunner in achieving a circular economy and that he wanted the government to financially support that transition. De Jong was elected with 2,280 preference votes and was sworn into the House of Representatives on 31 March. He vacated his seat in the Provincial Council of Friesland the following month, and he also left his ice cream company. In the House, De Jong is D66's spokesperson for economic affairs, SMEs, tourism, innovation, space travel, declining regions, competition, taxes, customs, state benefits, and state ownership, and he is on the following committees:
 Committee for Agriculture, Nature and Food Quality
 Committee for Digital Affairs
 Committee for Economic Affairs and Climate Policy
 Committee for Finance
 Committee for Foreign Trade and Development Cooperation
 Committee for Infrastructure and Water Management
 Public Expenditure Committee

He also proposed for the government to stand as a guarantor for loans intended to make small and medium-sized enterprises more sustainable in order to make it easier to obtain such loans at banks. He advised to appropriate €50 million to €100 million for this purpose. To address personnel shortages in multiple sectors, De Jong was in favor of welcoming more foreign workers to the Netherlands; D66 was the only major party supportive of plans by the European Commission to ease entry requirements for workers from Egypt, Tunisia, and Morocco.

As part of the Dutch farmers' protests, demonstrators blocked the entryways of De Jong's ice cream factory for the entirety of 2 July 2022 using tractors to prevent deliveries from coming through. Politicians of D66 had earlier proposed to halve the Netherlands' livestock in order to protect nature reserves from reactive nitrogen emissions and in order to allow for the construction of homes and infrastructure following a verdict by the Council of State that those emissions had to be lowered. De Jong refused to comply with the demand of the farmers to have a discussion, saying he only has conversations when there is decency and mutual respect.

Personal life 
De Jong lives in the Friesland town of Gorredijk, where he has lived his entire life except for when he studied in Groningen. He has a wife called Wendel and three sons, the last of whom was born in March 2021.

References

External links 
 Personal website 

1984 births
21st-century Dutch businesspeople
21st-century Dutch politicians
Democrats 66 politicians
Dutch chief executives in the food industry
Living people
Members of the House of Representatives (Netherlands)
Members of the Provincial Council of Friesland
Municipal councillors in Friesland
People from Opsterland